Shanshui poetry or Shanshui shi (lit. "mountains and rivers poetry") refers to the movement in poetry, influenced by the shan shui (landscape) painting style, which became known as Shanshui poetry, or "landscape poetry". Sometimes, the poems were designed to be viewed with a particular work of art, others were intended to be "textual art" that evoked an image inside a reader's mind. It is one of the more important Classical Chinese poetry genres. Developing in the third and fourth centuries in China, Shanshui poetry contributed to the process of forming a unique aesthetic outlook.

Development
Although landscape images were present in the Shijing and the Chuci, the unique development in Shanshui poetry was that the main focus became on the natural landscape, rather than the use of nature as a backdrop for the human presence. The Six Dynasties poet and government official Xie Lingyun has been dubbed not only Duke of Kangle but also the father of Shan-shui poetry.

Prominent practitioners
One of the first, early Chinese landscape poetry was the Jian'an poet and general Cao Cao. The poems resulting from the Orchid Pavilion Gathering were particularly important, too. During the Tang Dynasty, Meng Haoran and Wang Wei were both important practitioners.

See also
Chinese poetry
Classical Chinese poetry
Fields and Gardens poetry
Orchid Pavilion Gathering
Shan shui (painting)
Topographical poetry
Wangchuan ji
Wenzhou

Notes

References
Yip, Wai-lim (1997). Chinese Poetry: An Anthology of Major Modes and Genres . (Durham and London: Duke University Press). 
Watson, Burton (1971). Chinese Lyricism: Shih Poetry from the Second to the Twelfth Century. (New York: Columbia University Press). 

Chinese poetry genres